Russia competed at the 2004 Summer Paralympics in Athens, Greece. The team included 84 athletes—49 men and 35 women. Russian competitors won forty-one medals, sixteen gold, eight silver and seventeen bronze, to finish eleventh in the medal table.

Medallists

Sports

Athletics

Men's track

Men's field

Women's track

Women's field

Equestrian

Football 7-a-side
The men's football 7-a-side team won a bronze medal after defeating Argentina.

Players
Pavel Borisov
Evgeny Chubko
Marat Fatiakhdinov
Alexander Frolov
Aleksandr Glushonok
Anton Kalachev
Andrey Kuvaev
Andrey Lozhechnikov
Lasha Murvanidze
Ivan Potekhin
Oleg Smirnov
Alexei Tchesmine

Tournament

Judo

Men

Women

Powerlifting

Men

Women

Sailing

Shooting

Men

Women

Swimming

Men

Women

Table tennis

Men

Women

Wheelchair tennis

See also
Russia at the Paralympics
Russia at the 2004 Summer Olympics

References 

Nations at the 2004 Summer Paralympics
2004
Summer Paralympics